Lecanactis rubra is a species of corticolous (bark-dwelling), crustose lichen in the family Roccellaceae. Found in Madagascar, it was formally described as a new species in 2009 by Damien Ertz and Emmanuël Sérusiaux. This lichen is only known to occur at the type locality.

Lecanactis rubra has a cream-coloured, verrucose (pimply), mat thallus that lacks a cortex. The prothallus is dark brown and byssoid (i.e., like teased wool). The ascospores are fusiform (spindle-shaped) with 3 septa, and typically measure 22.5–27.0 by 5.5–6.0 μm. The lichen contains gyrophoric acid, a secondary compound that can be detected using thin-layer chromatography. It also has an unidentified anthraquinone that is present as numerous red crystals in the excipulum (the ring-shaped layer surrounding the spore-bearing hymenium); the specific epithet rubra refers to this characteristic.

References

Roccellaceae
Lichen species
Lichens described in 2009
Lichens of Madagascar
Taxa named by Emmanuël Sérusiaux